Camplong-d'Aude is a commune in the Aude department in southern France.

Population

Geography
The river Orbieu forms most of the commune's southern border.

See also
 Corbières AOC
 Communes of the Aude department

References

Communes of Aude
Aude communes articles needing translation from French Wikipedia